Beacon Island is a small uninhabited island in Hudson Strait, Qikiqtaaluk Region, Nunavut, Canada. It lies just east of Dorset Island and the community of Cape Dorset. The SS Nascopie was wrecked on a nearby reef.

See also
 Anguttuaq, formerly Beacon Island
 Beacon Island (Ungava Bay)
 Upajjana, formerly Beacon Island

References

Islands of Baffin Island
Islands of Hudson Strait
Uninhabited islands of Qikiqtaaluk Region